Rexonics is a high-power ultrasound technology for commercial oil well stimulation.

History

In 2008, Ogsonic AG was founded as a spin-off of an industrial ultrasonic application provider to focus on the development and production of ultrasonic solutions for the oil and gas industry. 

In 2013, to increase the commercialization of the Rexonics technology, Rexonic AG was formed through a joint venture between Rex International Holding and Ogsonic AG.

In 2016, Rex International Holding pared down its stake to 50% from 66.67% to Ogsonic.

Technology 

The Rexonics technology is a high powered ultrasonic tool used to stimulate onshore and offshore wells. The proprietary and patented technology is designed to clean the production well bore of typical oil production inhibitors such as wax, paraffin and salt deposits.

References

Companies established in 2013